The 2014 Conference USA baseball tournament will be held from May 21 through 25 at Pete Taylor Park in Hattiesburg, Mississippi.  The annual tournament determines the conference champion of the Division I Conference USA for college baseball.  The tournament champion will receive the league's automatic bid to the 2014 NCAA Division I baseball tournament.  This is the last of 19 athletic championship events held by the conference in the 2013–14 academic year.

The tournament was established in 1996, Conference USA's first season of play.  Tulane and Rice have won the most championships, with five.  Among current, returning teams, only Marshall has never won a title.  The conference adds eight new teams for 2014.

Seeding and format
The top eight finishers from the regular season were seeded one through eight.  The tournament returned to a double-elimination format, previously used from 1996 through 2010.

Bracket and results

Schedule

 Game 11 will have a necessary if winner of Game 9 also wins Game 11. If so the game will be played on May 24 at 4:00 pm. 

 Game 12 will have a necessary if winner of Game 10 also wins Game 11. If so the game will be played on May 24 at 7:30 pm.

Conference championship

All-Tournament Team
The following players were named to the All-Tournament Team.  Rice outfielder Michael Aquino, one of five Owls selected, was named the tournament's Most Valuable Player.

References

Tournament
Conference USA Baseball Tournament
Conference USA baseball tournament
Conference USA baseball tournament
College sports tournaments in Mississippi
Hattiesburg, Mississippi
Baseball competitions in Mississippi